The men's 4 × 100 metres relay event at the 1959 Summer Universiade was held at the Stadio Comunale di Torino in Turin on 6 September 1959.

Results

Heats

Final

References

Athletics at the 1959 Summer Universiade
1959